John Ball (29 September 1900 – December 1989) was an English international footballer who played as an inside left.

Early life
Ball was born in Stockport with nine older siblings; his father was Welsh and a railway labourer.

Career
Ball played for Silverwood Colliery, Sheffield United, Bristol Rovers, Wath Athletic, Bury, West Ham United, Coventry City, Stourbridge, Hinckley United, Atherstone Town, and Coventry Gas. In the Football League he scored 108 goals in 269 appearances. With West Ham he scored 9 goals in 15 league games.

He earned one cap for England, in 1927.

later life
By 1939 he was married and working as an aero department inspector. He died in Coventry in December 1989, aged 89.

References

1900 births
1989 deaths
English people of Welsh descent
English footballers
England international footballers
Silverwood Colliery F.C. players
Sheffield United F.C. players
Bristol Rovers F.C. players
Wath Athletic F.C. players
Bury F.C. players
West Ham United F.C. players
Coventry City F.C. players
Stourbridge F.C. players
Hinckley United F.C. players
Atherstone Town F.C. players
English Football League players
Association football inside forwards
Footballers from Stockport